In physics, the topological structure of  spinfoam or  spin foam consists of two-dimensional faces representing a configuration required by functional integration to obtain a Feynman's path integral description of quantum gravity. These structures are employed in loop quantum gravity as a version of quantum foam.

In loop quantum gravity

The covariant formulation of loop quantum gravity provides the best formulation of the dynamics of the theory of quantum gravity – a quantum field theory where the invariance under diffeomorphisms of general relativity applies. The resulting path integral represents a sum over all the possible configurations of spin foam.

Spin network

A spin network is a one-dimensional graph, together with labels on its vertices and edges which encode aspects of a spatial geometry. 

A spin network is defined as a diagram like the Feynman diagram which makes a basis of connections between the elements of a differentiable manifold for the Hilbert spaces defined over them, and for computations of amplitudes between two different hypersurfaces of the manifold. Any evolution of the spin network provides a spin foam over a manifold of one dimension higher than the dimensions of the corresponding spin network. A spin foam is analogous to quantum history.

Spacetime

Spin networks provide a language to describe the quantum geometry of space. Spin foam does the same job for spacetime.

Spacetime can be defined as a superposition of spin foams, which is a generalized Feynman diagram where instead of a graph, a higher-dimensional complex is used. In topology this sort of space is called a 2-complex. A spin foam is a particular type of 2-complex, with labels for vertices, edges and faces. The boundary of a spin foam is a spin network, just as in the theory of manifolds, where the boundary of an n-manifold is an (n-1)-manifold.

In Loop Quantum Gravity, the present Spin Foam Theory has been inspired by the work of Ponzano–Regge model. The concept of a spin foam, although not called that at the time, was introduced in the paper "A Step Toward Pregeometry I: Ponzano–Regge Spin Networks and the Origin of Spacetime Structure in Four Dimensions" by Norman J. LaFave. In this paper, the concept of creating sandwiches of 4-geometry (and local time scale) from spin networks is described, along with the connection of these spin 4-geometry sandwiches to form paths of spin networks connecting given spin network boundaries (spin foams). Quantization of the structure leads to a generalized Feynman path integral over connected paths of spin networks between spin network boundaries. This paper goes beyond much of the later work by showing how 4-geometry is already present in the seemingly three dimensional spin networks, how local time scales occur, and how the field equations and conservation laws are generated by simple consistency requirements. The idea was reintroduced in a 1997 paper and later developed into the Barrett–Crane model. The formulation that is used nowadays is commonly called EPRL after the names of the authors of a series of seminal papers, but the theory has also seen fundamental contributions from the work of many others, such as Laurent Freidel (FK model) and Jerzy Lewandowski (KKL model).

Definition
The summary partition function for a spin foam model is 

with:

 a set of 2-complexes  each consisting out of faces , edges  and vertices . Associated to each 2-complex  is a weight 
 a set of irreducible representations  which label the faces and intertwiners  which label the edges.
 a vertex amplitude  and an edge amplitude 
 a face amplitude , for which we almost always have

See also
 Group field theory
 Loop quantum gravity
 Lorentz invariance in loop quantum gravity
 String-net liquid

References

External links 
 
 
 

Theoretical physics
Loop quantum gravity